Xango may refer to:
 XanGo, a company based in Utah that markets a beverage, XanGo juice
 Shango, one of the key orishas of Yoruba mythology
 The name of an Afro-Brazilian religion (also written Xangô)
 "Xangô", a Brazilian song by Luiz Bonfá
 Xango, a brand of menswear designed by Francesca Miranda